University Christian School is a private Christian school in Jacksonville, Florida, U.S. It is part of the ministry of the University Church, a  local Baptist congregation. It serves students from pre-kindergarten through graduation. The school has a strong focus on sports and has won several state titles in various sports such as football, baseball and wrestling. The school was established as a segregation academy in order to keep white children away from minorities in response to court ordered desegregation of public schools.

History
University Christian School is an extension of University Church. University Church was founded in 1950; Jack J. Dinsbeer became pastor of the small congregation in 1953. Under his leadership the church grew in membership, and in 1965 the church established a kindergarten. In 1970 University Christian School expanded into a full elementary school with grades one through six. The first class graduated in 1973, and a year later the administration acquired more land for additional buildings to house a middle and high school. The school continued to expand in the 1990s.

Academics
In 2012, the school replaced textbooks with iPads.

Notable alumni
 Otis Anderson Jr., American football player
 Glenn Davis, Former professional baseball player (Houston Astros, Baltimore Orioles)
 Storm Davis, Former professional baseball player (Baltimore Orioles, San Diego Padres, Oakland Athletics, Kansas City Royals, Detroit Tigers) and current Pitching Coach of the Daytona Cubs
 Ashley Greene, actress in the Twilight Saga, actually didn't graduate from University Christian School. She graduated from Wolfson High School after leaving University Christian. 
 Marquis Haynes, Outside Linebacker for the Carolina Panthers
 Kelly Kelly, WWE personality. Kelly Kelly, formerly known as Barbara Blank, left University Christian School and actually graduated from Englewood High school.

References

External links
 http://www.ucsjax.com/

Baptist schools in the United States
Christian schools in Florida
High schools in Jacksonville, Florida
Private high schools in Florida
Private middle schools in Florida
Private elementary schools in Florida
Segregation academies in Florida